Wakefield Memorial High School is a public school located in Wakefield, Massachusetts, United States.

As of the 2007-08 school year, the school had an enrollment of 1,006 students and 83 classroom teachers (on an FTE basis), for a student-teacher ratio of 18.1.

Academics
The Superintendent of Wakefield Public Schools is Douglas Lyons. Amy McLeod is the principal of WHS.

The 2008–2009 school year marked the first drastic scheduling change in over ten years as WHS switched to a rotating, six-block daily schedule. Periods condensed to 54 minutes in length. WHS began offering Italian language classes for the 2008–2009 school year as well.

The school newspaper, advised by English teacher James Martin, is titled the Wakefield Express and is published exclusively online. The paper is available for viewing at The Express Online.

In 2008, WHS was featured in Boston magazine for spending the least money per student of any public school in the state, landing it at number one in the "Most Bang for the Buck" category.

Advanced Placement Course offerings
Junior and Senior year: AP United States History, AP Statistics, AP Biology, AP Chemistry, AP Macroeconomics, AP Computer Science, AP Music Theory

Senior year:  AP Visual Art, AP United States Government and Politics, AP English, AP Calculus AB, AP Calculus BC, AP Physics, AP Spanish, AP French, AP Television Production (conditional, i.e. New England Institute of Art)

Athletics
Fall Sports: Football, Soccer, Cross Country, Swimming (Girls), Golf (Boys), Field Hockey (Girls), Volleyball (Girls), Dance, Cheerleading, Marching Band

Winter Sports: Indoor Track, Basketball, Hockey, Swimming (Northeast Vocational), Wrestling, Winter Percussion, Winterguard

Spring Sports: Outdoor Track, Baseball, Lacrosse, Boys' and Girls' Tennis, Softball

Under Head Coach Mike Boyages, the football team has achieved an overall record of 89–34–3 in his eleven years leading the team since 1997. The team has won the Middlesex League Championship seven times under Boyages, in 1997, 1999, 2000, 2001, making it to the Division II "Super Bowl" State Championships each of those years. In 1999, the team earned its first Super Bowl Championship, with a 13–7 win over Acton-Boxboro High School.

In 1997, both the boys' and girls' basketball teams from Wakefield High School won Division II state championships, and the boys' soccer team won the state title that same year, defeating East Long Meadow High School 1-0 to win the state championship.

The 2007–2008 girls' ice hockey team advanced to the state championship game for the first time in Wakefield history.

In the fall of 2008, the varsity dance team (under the direction of Candice Spencer and Stacey Gargano) took 3rd place in the MSSAA State Dance Tournament.

In the fall of 2009, the varsity dance team (under the direction of Candice Spencer) took 3rd place in the division of High School Varsity Dance and took 3rd place overall in the entire Dance Division at the New England Cheer and Dance Tournament.  In the fall of 2009, the varsity dance team was honored with the team academic excellence award from the MSSAA.

The 2010–2011 boys' hockey team advanced to the Division One Championship at the TD Garden and was the 2010–2011 Division One North Hockey Champions.

Since 2015, the Director of Athletics for Wakefield Public Schools has been Mr. Brendan Kent.

Recently, the Wakefield community has voted to get rid of the Wakefield Warriors logo, the logo that the high school uses, deeming it racist and offensive towards Native American people. The question of if the logo should be kept was on the 2021 ballot of the town's election.

Performing arts
The Performing Arts Director for Wakefield Public Schools is Mr. Thomas Bankert.

The Warrior Marching Band competes in the MICCA and NESBA competitions circuits each year. Wakefield hosts its own MICCA competition every October at Landrigan Field with the Warrior Marching Band as the last band to perform. The band's 2008 show, "A Moonwalk Through Time," was a collection of Michael Jackson music and featured the musicians dancing the Thriller in the midst of the performance. The band came in first place in their division at NESBA Finals and won a gold medal for the first time since 2003.  Its 2011 show, based on the music of Aerosmith, came in first with a platinum medal at NESBA Finals.  Since then, the marching band has performed shows such as a tribute to Stevie Wonder, the music of Dave Matthews Band, Disney's Frozen, Double Agent, Immortal, Mirror Mirror, Flight and Street Lights Big Dreams. In 2016, the Wakefield Warrior Marching band came in 2nd at NESBA finals earning a 96.0, A Platinum Medal, and the Best Drum Major Award. The Wakefield Warrior Marching band also had a two 5 star sweep at both there MICCA Competitions. At MICCA Finals the band earned a perfect score winning MICCA Finals. In 2018 their performance of their show Flight earned them 2nd place at the NESBA Finals.

The Drama Club, which is headed by English and Theatre teacher William Karvouniaris, puts on three productions each year; a musical piece in the fall, a 40 minute piece in the winter (which they bring to the Massachusetts High School Drama Guild One-Act Festival), and a play in the spring (this order has since changed as of 2017-2018 school year) . The Spring 2017 Musical Joseph and the Amazing Technicolor Dreamcoat earned a MET Musical Award for set design and props management. 
In 2018, The Drama Club's Fest Piece (Anatomy of Gray) moved into the Semi-finals of the METG festival.  In 2018, the fall musical production of Fiddler on the Roof received seven MET award nominations, winning two.

WMHS has an active choral program, including 3 curricular choruses and 3 extracurricular a cappella groups, Voices of Steel, In Big Treble, and  She Major. Voices of Steel and She Major are both auditioned, competitive groups.

In summer 2010, the Drama Club participated in the American High School Theatre Festival at the Fringe Festival in Edinburgh Festival Fringe, one of the largest performing arts festivals in the world. The Drama Club was accepted after a representative for AHSTF saw their February 2008 performance of Cymbeline at the Massachusetts High School Drama Guild One-Act Festival. At The Fringe, the club performed an original play by Emily Holmes, Pandora's Book.

Both the Chamber Singers and Warrior Marching Band have performed the National Anthem at Fenway Park.

In March 2016, the Wakefield High School Winter Guard team won first place in their division at the 2016 NESBA winter guard finals.  The team had an undefeated regular season as well.

On February 11, 2017, all-girls a cappella group She Major placed third in the International Championship of High School A Cappella quarterfinals, winning them a spot in the semi-finals.

Visual Arts
The Wakefield High School Visual Arts program consists of 2-D, 3-D, digital and film and video courses. 
WPS Visual Arts can be found on Facebook as well as Instagram. Film & Video can be found on YouTube.

Demographics
The racial makeup of Wakefield High School is: 94% White, 3% Black, 2% Hispanic and 1% Asian/American Indian.

Wakefield High School participates in the METCO program, a grant program funded by the Commonwealth intended to reduce racial imbalance. Students from the inner city are given the opportunity to attend Wakefield High School.

Notable alumni
Scott Brown, Massachusetts State Senator and US Senator
Stephen Carriere (2007 Graduate), 2007 World Junior Champion in figure skating (men's singles)
David Dellinger, Radical pacifist and member of the Chicago Seven
Israel Horovitz, Playwright, Father of Adam "Ad-Rock" Horovitz
Mark Kumpel, Member of the 1984 US Olympic Ice Hockey Team and former NHL player with the Winnipeg Jets, Quebec Nordiques, and the Detroit Red Wings
Dave Lapham, Cincinnati Bengals radio broadcaster and formerly a player for the Bengals and USFL team the New Jersey Generals
Marcia Pankratz, Member of the 1988 and 1996 Olympic field hockey team and former head coach of field hockey at the University of Michigan
Anthony Fabiano, 2015 Harvard graduate and NFL center 
Mark Plansky, notable college basketball player for Villanova University in the 1980s

References

External links

 http://www.wakefieldexpressonline.com/
Statistical data for Wakefield High School, National Center for Education Statistics
The Wakefield Étudiant
 WHS TV 15 Productions

Similar websites
Wakefield High School, Wake Forest, NC
Wakefield HS Bands, Wake Forest, NC

Schools in Middlesex County, Massachusetts
Buildings and structures in Wakefield, Massachusetts
Public high schools in Massachusetts